Lifeblood is the seventh studio album by Welsh alternative rock band Manic Street Preachers. Recorded in 2003, it was released on 1 November 2004 by record label Sony Music UK.

The album was met with generally positive reviews from critics, yielding two singles, "The Love of Richard Nixon" and "Empty Souls". The album peaked at number 13 in the UK Album Chart.

Writing and recording 

The working title of Lifeblood was Litany, hinting that the song "Litany" recorded during the Lifeblood sessions was originally intended for inclusion. The track, however, only featured as a B-side to the "Empty Souls" CD single. The album includes a song about Emily Pankhurst ("Emily"), a leader in the British woman's suffrage movement, but, otherwise, the band's earlier political lyrics have been replaced by personal reflection, such as on the band's past ("1985") and former member Richey Edwards ("Cardiff Afterlife").

Lifeblood was recorded at studios in New York City, Wales and Ireland by frequent collaborator Greg Haver, with additional contributions from Tony Visconti and Tom Elmhirst. Two tracks recorded – "Antarctic" and "The Soulmates" – remain only on the Japanese version of the album.

The album is a departure musically, replacing the band's traditional guitar walls with more subtle and melodic playing, emphasis instead being given to keyboards and synthesizers. This results in the album being described as pop rock, synthpop, and synthrock sound, something Nicky Wire described the album as "elegiac pop" throughout the recording process.

Wire talked about the ghosts that haunted this record and stated that the record was a retrospective: "The main themes are death and solitude and ghosts. Being haunted by history and being haunted by your own past. Sleep is beautiful for me. I hate dreaming because it ruins ten hours of bliss. I had a lot of bad dreams when Richey [Edwards] first disappeared. Not ugly dreams, but nagging things. Until we wrote 'Design for Life', it was six months of misery. Lifeblood doesn't seek to exorcise Edwards' ghost, though, just admits that there are no answers".

Nicky Wire reflected on the album in 2021: "Lifeblood is very much a withdrawal album. I was digging deeper holes, to just piss people off - without even trying. There's certain bits of it we do love. But as a man who grew up with the Guinness Book of Hit Records, the fact that album went in at Number 13 just crushed me: 'Not even in the Top 10?! How has this happened?'"

Release 

Lifeblood was preceded by the single "The Love of Richard Nixon", released on 18 October 2004. During the mid-week chart the single was at the No. 1 position, but dropped and ended up peaking at No. 2 on the UK singles chart.

Lifeblood was released on 1 November 2004. It entered the UK Albums Chart at No. 13, selling 23,990 in the first week and spending only 3 weeks in the Top 75. The album has gone Silver, but it is the least commercially successful album by the band. It has currently sold around 90,000 copies in the UK.

"Empty Souls", the second and final single from the album, was released on 10 January 2005. Like the previous single, it debuted and peaked at No. 2.

Reception 

Lifeblood received generally positive reviews from critics, which had not happened for the band's previous effort Know Your Enemy. The album has a weighted average score of 66 out of 100 on Metacritic based on 9 reviews, indicating "generally favorable reviews".

AllMusic awarded the album three stars out of five and stated: "Lifeblood is a pleasant listen, but once you peel away the keyboards, sensitively strummed guitars and tasteful harmonies and concentrate on Bradfield's nakedly open voice and Wire's terminally collegiate lyrics, it's hard to escape the unintentional pathos that winds up defining the album and, conceivably, the band's latter-day career."

Barry Nicolson of NME wrote: "Where Know Your Enemy strived vainly for relevance, Lifeblood is seemingly content to exist as a highbrow rock record. Out go song titles that were half-baked political manifestos in themselves ('Freedom of Speech Won't Feed My Children' anyone?), in come elegiac pop anthems ('1985') and the welcome presence of Bowie producer Tony Visconti to add a glacial sheen to the whole affair. Indeed, this is arguably the best Manics album since Everything Must Go."

Colin Weston of Drowned in Sound praised the album, writing: "This is not rock, it is arguably not indie and would fit very comfortably next to the soft nu-wave eighties pop albums that your auntie has on the shelf... and it is quite simply brilliant! [...] 'Generation Terrorists' may well live forever in the hearts of their fans but 'Lifeblood' may well live forever as one of the best commercial albums of the bands career." John Garrett from PopMatters wrote "Richey may be long dead, but there's still warm blood coursing through the Manics' veins. They are for real—although maybe not in the way history had intended."

A negative review came from Q, calling the album "miserable and insipid".

Track listing

Personnel 

 Manic Street Preachers

 James Dean Bradfield – lead vocals, lead and rhythm guitar
 Sean Moore – drums, drum programming
 Nicky Wire – bass guitar

 Additional personnel

 Nick Nasmyth – keyboards
 Jeremy Shaw – additional keyboards
 Greg Haver – percussion

 Technical personnel

 Greg Haver – production on tracks 1–9 and 11
 Tony Visconti – production on tracks 7, 10 and 12
 Tom Elmhirst – additional production on tracks 1, 2, 7, 10 and 12, mixing on tracks 1, 2 and 4–12
 Mark "Spike" Stent – mixing of "Empty Souls"
 Mario J. McNulty – engineering assistance
 Stefano Sofia – engineering assistance
 Steve Davis – engineering assistance
 Loz Williams – engineering assistance on "Empty Souls"
 Farrow Design – sleeve artwork design and art direction
 John Ross – sleeve photography

Charts

Certifications

References

External links 

 Lifeblood at YouTube (streamed copy where licensed)
 

Manic Street Preachers albums
Pop rock albums by Welsh artists
2004 albums
Epic Records albums
Albums produced by Tony Visconti
Albums produced by Greg Haver